Modern Coast Rangers is an association football club based in Mombasa, Kenya. The club currently competes in the Kenyan National Super League.

History
Previously known as Magongo Rangers, the club acquired its current name in 2013 after a sponsorship agreement with The Modern Coast Company.

Stadium
The team currently plays its home games at the Refinery Grounds.

Performance in CAF competitions

References

External links
Modern Coast Rangers profile at SoccerVista

Kenyan National Super League clubs
FKF Division One clubs
Football clubs in Kenya